US Highway 27 (US 27) is a part of the United States Numbered Highway System that runs from Miami, Florida, to Fort Wayne in the US state of Indiana. In Indiana, it is a State Road that enters the state in College Corner, Ohio, and West College Corner, Indiana. The  of US 27 that lie within Indiana serve as a major conduit. Most of the highway is listed on the National Highway System. Various sections are rural two-lane highway, urbanized four-lane divided highway. The northernmost community along the highway is Fort Wayne in the northeast part of the state. The highway ends at an interchange with Interstate 69 (I-69) north of downtown Fort Wayne after serving the east central and northeast regions of Indiana.

US 27 passes through farm fields and urban areas, and parallel to the Ohio state line.  The highway is included in the Gene Stratton Memorial Highway. Historical landmarks along the highway include the Levi Coffin House, Portland Commercial Historic District and the Allen County Court House.

US 27 was first designated as a US Highway in 1926.  US 27 replaced the original SR 48, SR 21, and SR 46 designations of the highway which dated back to the formation of the Indiana State Road system. SR 46 ran from Ohio State line to Liberty and SR 21 ran from Liberty through Richmond to Portland ending in Fort Wayne.  SR 46 ran from Auburn to Angola.  Realignments and construction projects have expanded the highway to four lanes in Adams and Allen counties.

Route description

US 27 enters Indiana heading northwest from Ohio, parallel to CSX railroad track, in the town of West College Corner.  In West College Corner the highway passes through the center of town, on a street named Liberty Avenue.  The route continues northwest towards Liberty, as a two-lane rural highway passing through farmland.  On the way to Liberty the road passes through Cottage Grove and crosses the Indiana Eastern Railroad. In Liberty the highway has an all-way stop at SR 44, this intersection is the southern end of the SR 44 concurrency.  In the center of Liberty the two roads end the concurrency at a traffic light with SR 101, with US 27 heading north, SR 44 heading west and SR 101 heading south.  US 27 leaves Liberty heading due north as a two-lane rural highway.  The road enters Richmond from the south, with a series of curves and a traffic light at SR 227.  US 27 and SR 227 begin a concurrency at this traffic light and both routes head north, heading for downtown Richmond.  The concurrency passes over the Indiana Eastern Railroad tracks, as a four-lane undivided road.  In downtown Richmond the roadway becomes one-way streets, begins after O street, with northbound on Ninth street and southbound of Eighth street.  The two street head straight through downtown passing residential areas, before reaching commercial areas.  At C Street the one-way pairs end and the road passes over Norfolk Southern railroad tracks.  After the railroad tracks the concurrency with SR 227 ends with SR 227 heading northeast.  US 27 continues northerly as a four-lane undivided highway.  The road leaves Richmond having a single-point urban interchange, with Interstate 70 (I-70) and US 35.  The route heads northwest from Richmond towards Portland, as a two-lane rural highway passing through farmland with a few houses.  The road passes through Fountain City and passed the Levi Coffin House, a building on the National Historic Landmark list.

The highway passes through Lynn and then has an intersection with US 36.  North of US 36 the highway heads towards Winchester.  The road passes Winchester on the east side.  While in Winchester US 27 passes a mix of commercial, residential and farmland, and also has an interchange with SR 32.  The road begins a concurrency with SR 26 south of the Portland Commercial Historic District, a historic district that is listed on the National Register of Historic Places.  The concurrency passes through the historic district as a four-lane road with a center turn lane.  North of the historic district the concurrency with SR 26 ends and a concurrency with SR 67 begins.  After SR 26, the two routes head through commercial properties, with a few houses, as a two-lane street with a center turn lane. The concurrency heads north leaving Portland as a two-lane rural highway, passing through farmland with a few houses.  The concurrency enters Bryant and on the north side of town the concurrency ends with SR 67.  The route has a traffic-light at SR 124 west of Monroe.  At this traffic light the road becomes a four-lane divided highway, heading north towards Fort Wayne.  On the way to Fort Wayne, the route passes through Decatur and at a traffic light a concurrency with US 33 begins.  As the two highways head farther into Decatur US 224 joins the other two routes in a concurrency with three routes. US 224 leaves the concurrency heading due west for Huntington. The other two routes continue north-northwest leaving Decatur and heading for Fort Wayne.

The concurrency with US 33 ends at a diamond interchange with I-469 on the south side of Fort Wayne.  North of I-469, the road becomes known as Decatur Road and continues northwest passing through farmland with houses.  The name of the road changes to Lafayette Street at a traffic light with Anthony Boulevard.  North of this traffic light the road enters commercial areas followed by residential areas.  The road becomes a four-lane undivided highway north of Pettit Avenue.  The route becomes one-way pairs at McKinnie Avenue with northbound on Lafayette Street and Spy Run Avenue and southbound is on Clinton Street.  Both One-way streets pass under the Chicago, Fort Wayne and Eastern Railroad and enters downtown Fort Wayne.  In downtown the streets past near the Allen County Court House and Parkview Field.  Parkview Field is home to the Fort Wayne TinCaps a minor league baseball team in the Midwest League.  The road then passes under the Norfolk Southern Railroad tracks and passes through Headwaters Park.  The streets leaves downtown by crossing over the St. Marys River.  North of Spy Run Avenue Extended the one-way pairs end and the road becomes a four-lane highway with a center turn lane, retaining the name Clinton Street.  Clinton Street is passing through commercial properties.  US 27 leaves Clinton Street and heads north on Lima Road.  Lima Road then passes through a mix of residential and commercial properties as a four-lane undivided highway.  The street has a traffic light at SR 930, also known as Coliseum Boulevard.  At this traffic light Lima Road becomes a six-lane divided highway passing through commercial property and heads towards an interchange at I-69.  The interchange at I-69 is the northern terminus of US 27, Lima Road continues north as SR 3 towards Kendallville.

The entire length of U.S. Route 27 in Indiana is included in the National Highway System (NHS).  The NHS is a network of highways that are identified as being most important for the economy, mobility and defense of the nation.  The highway is maintained by the Indiana Department of Transportation (INDOT) like all other U.S. Highways in the state. The department tracks the traffic volumes along all state highways as a part of its maintenance responsibilities using a metric called average annual daily traffic (AADT). This measurement is a calculation of the traffic level along a segment of roadway for any average day of the year. In 2010, INDOT figured that lowest traffic levels were 3,090 vehicles and 580 commercial vehicles used the highway daily from SR 28 to Jay County line. The peak traffic volumes were 41,790 vehicles and 2,570 commercial vehicles AADT along the section of US 27 just north of downtown Fort Wayne.

History
The original route of US 27 was signed as three different state roads in 1918.  Old SR 48 from Ohio state line to Liberty, Old SR 48 headed west on what is now known as SR 44.  The section was from Liberty to Fort Wayne has Old SR 21.  Old SR 46 was the original number given the a segment from Auburn to Angola.  The section between the Old SR 21 and Old SR 46 was known as Custer Trail.  In 1924, the section north of Fort Wayne became Old SR 13 and went from Fort Wayne to the Michigan state line.  US 27 in Indiana is one of the original US Highways of 1926, then connecting Cheboygan, Michigan with Cincinnati through Fort Wayne.

In November 1967, Indiana completed its northern segment of Interstate 69, the last incomplete section being opened between Angola and the Michigan/Indiana state line, supplanting US 27 as a through route. Interstate 69 north of Fort Wayne had been completed in stages, the designation of US 27 was moved to the interstate. Some segments of old US 27 remained as state highways with designations as SR 327, SR 427, and SR 127. Parts of these routes, comprising what had been the old surface road of US 27, were eventually returned to country governments. Within greater Fort Wayne, US 27 was diverted from Coldwater Road to Lima road.  Then in 2001, INDOT removed the US 27 designation north of its interchange with I-69.

On March 9, 2007, legislation was introduced in the Indiana House of Representatives to designate US 27 as historic highway. Richmond, one of the cities through which US 27 passes, would have two historic highways passing through it as the original National Road (U.S. Route 40) runs through Richmond as well.

Major intersections

See also

References

External links
 

http://highwayexplorer.com/EndsPage.php?id=2006&section=1

 Indiana
27
Transportation in Fort Wayne, Indiana
Transportation in Adams County, Indiana
Transportation in Union County, Indiana
Transportation in Wayne County, Indiana
Transportation in Randolph County, Indiana
Transportation in Jay County, Indiana
Transportation in Allen County, Indiana